Dieppe-Memramcook was a provincial electoral district for the Legislative Assembly of New Brunswick, Canada. It was known as Memramcook from 1974 to 1994, and renamed Dieppe-Memramcook, until its dissolution in 2006.

Members of the Legislative Assembly

Election results

Dieppe-Memramcook

Memramcook

External links 
Website of the Legislative Assembly of New Brunswick

Former provincial electoral districts of New Brunswick